John Walshe (died 1572) was an English politician.

He was a Member (MP) of the Parliament of England for Cricklade in 1547, Bristol in March 1553, October 1553, April 1554, November 1554, 1555, 1559 and 1563, and for Somerset in 1558.

References

Year of birth missing
1572 deaths
English MPs 1547–1552
English MPs 1553 (Edward VI)
English MPs 1553 (Mary I)
English MPs 1554
English MPs 1554–1555
English MPs 1555
English MPs 1558
English MPs 1559
English MPs 1563–1567
Members of Parliament for Cricklade